Potassium aluminate is an inorganic compound with the formula KAlO2, which in aqueous solution exists as K[Al(OH)4].

Reactions
Potassium aluminate can be used to produce potassium alum with sulfuric acid in this reaction.

References

Potassium compounds
Aluminates